A number of ships of the Royal Navy were named Barbadoes or Barbados, after the island of Barbados.

 , a 14-gun sloop in service 1757–63
 , a 14-gun brig-sloop in service 1778–80
 , a 14-gun sloop in service 1782–84
 , a fifth-rate frigate, formerly the French privateer Braave
  was a 16-gun vessel, the American Herald, captured in 1813. She was paid-off in May 1816 and became a powder ship in Jamaica that was later wrecked with her remains being sold.
 , a Colony-class frigate

Royal Navy ship names